Kit Fysto is an electronic music duo formed by Matt Good (former guitarist in D.R.U.G.S. and From First To Last) and his friend AJ Calderon. The group name was originally called juiceb0x, but due to copyright infringement, their name was changed to Kit Fysto.

History 
While in D.R.U.G.S., Matt Good and friend, AJ Calderon, created a side project named "Kit Fysto"' (originally juiceb0x). The two produced a few dubstep/electronica remixes under this name. 

After Matt Good and two other band members left D.R.U.G.S., Kit Fysto became Matt Good and AJ Calderon's full-time project. The two played their first live show together at the 2012 Electric Glow Festival in Allentown, PA. The two have an official YouTube channel.

EP's
Cynical Youth EP (2013)

Remixes
Cobra Starship featuring Sabi - "You Make Me Feel..." (juiceb0x Remix)
Story of the Year - "Wake Up" (juiceb0x Remix)
Eva Simons - "Renegade" (Kit Fysto Remix)
Cobra Starship featuring Mac Miller - "Middle Finger" (Kit Fysto Remix)
Jeffree Star - "Prom Night!" (Kit Fysto Remix)
Skrillex & Damian "Jr. Gong" Marley - "Make It Bun Dem" (Kit Fysto Remix): presented to "Make It Bun Dem's Beatport Play Remix Contest"
The Veronicas - "Lolita" (Kit Fysto Remix)
SkyBlu & Mark Rosas - "#SEXSONG" (Kit Fysto Remix)
Justin Timberlake featuring  Jay-Z - "Suit & Tie" (Kit Fysto Bootleg Remix)

Band members 
 Matt Good - Production, sequencer
 AJ Calderon - Production, sequencer

References

External links
 "Kit Fysto YouTube Channel"
 "Kit Fysto Official Facebook"
 "Kit Fysto Official Soundcloud"

Electronica music groups